The Outstanding Team ESPY Award, known alternatively as the Best Team ESPY Award, has been presented annually since 1993 to the professional, collegiate, or national team, irrespective of nationality or sport contested, adjudged to be the best in a specified  twelve-month period preceding the awards ceremony. In 2001, the award was bifurcated and the resulting honors were styled as the College Team of the Year and Pro Team of the Year ESPY Awards; the awards were joined once more in 2002.

Between 1993 and 2004, the award voting panel comprised variously fans; sportswriters and broadcasters, sports executives, and retired sportspersons, termed collectively experts; and ESPN personalities, but balloting thereafter has been exclusively by fans over the Internet from amongst choices selected by the ESPN Select Nominating Committee.

Through the 2001 iteration of the ESPY Awards, ceremonies were conducted in February of each year to honor achievements over the previous calendar year; awards presented thereafter are conferred in July and reflect performance from the June previous. The award wasn't awarded in 2020 due to the COVID-19 pandemic.

List of winners

See also
 Sports trophies and awards

References

 
 List of winners from ESPN's ESPY's site

ESPY Awards
American sports trophies and awards
Awards established in 1993
1993 establishments in the United States